Mława railway station is a railway station at Mława, Mława County, Masovian, Poland. It is served by Koleje Mazowieckie.

Train services
The station is served by the following service(s):

 Intercity services (IC) Łódź Fabryczna — Warszawa — Gdańsk Glowny — Kołobrzeg
Intercity services (IC) Olsztyn - Warszawa - Skierniewice - Łódź
Intercity services (IC) Olsztyn - Warszawa - Skierniewice - Częstochowa - Katowice - Bielsko-Biała
Intercity services (IC) Olsztyn - Warszawa - Skierniewice - Częstochowa - Katowice - Gliwice - Racibórz
Intercity services (TLK) Gdynia Główna — Zakopane 
Intercity services (TLK) Kołobrzeg — Gdynia Główna — Warszawa Wschodnia — Kraków Główny

References

Station article at kolej.one.pl

Railway stations in Warsaw